Ivan Mikhailovich Sidorenko (12 September 1919 – 19 February 1994) was a Red Army officer and a Hero of the Soviet Union, who served during World War II. He was one of the top Soviet snipers in the war, with five hundred confirmed kills.

Biography
Born to a peasant family in Glinkovsky District, Smolensk Oblast, Russia, Sidorenko attended ten grades of school, and later studied at the Penza Art College at Penza, south-east of Moscow. In 1939, he dropped out of college, and was conscripted into the Red Army for training at the Simferopol Military Infantry School, in the Crimean Peninsula.

Great Patriotic War
In 1941, he fought in the Battle of Moscow, as a Junior Lieutenant of a mortar company. During the battle, he spent a lot of time teaching himself to snipe. His hunts for enemy soldiers were successful, prompting Sidorenko's commanders to order him to train others, who were chosen for their eyesight, weapons knowledge, and endurance. He first taught them theory, and then slowly started taking them out on combat missions with him. The Germans soon began fielding snipers of their own in Sidorenko's area of operation, to counter the new threat posed by him and his men.

Sidorenko became assistant commander of the Headquarters of the 1122nd Rifle Regiment, fighting as part of the 1st Baltic Front. Though he mainly instructed, he occasionally fought in battles, taking one of his trainees with him. On one of these excursions, he destroyed a tank and three tractors using incendiary bullets. However, he was wounded several times, most seriously in Estonia in 1944; as a result of which he remained hospitalized until the end of the war. While recuperating from this wound, Sidorenko was awarded the title of Hero of the Soviet Union on 4 June 1944; afterwards he was prohibited from seeing combat again by his superiors, as he was a valuable sniper trainer.

By the end of the war, he was credited with five hundred confirmed kills, and had trained over two hundred and fifty snipers. Ranked a Major, he was the most successful Soviet sniper of the Second World War, and used the Russian Mosin–Nagant rifle, equipped with a telescopic sight.

Post-war life
After the war ended, he retired from the Red Army, and settled down in Chelyabinsk Oblast, in the Ural Mountains, where he worked as the foreman of a coal mine. In 1974, he moved to the Republic of Dagestan, in the Caucasus. He died on 19 February 1994 in Kizlyar, Dagestan.

Soviet documents
Award document, the Order of the Red Star, 31 December 1942:

War Diary of the 1122 Rifle Regiment, page 130, 1 May 1943:

References

1919 births
1994 deaths
People from Smolensk Oblast
Soviet military snipers
Heroes of the Soviet Union
Soviet military personnel of World War II
Recipients of the Order of Lenin
Ukrainian military snipers
Recipients of the Medal "For Courage" (Russia)
Recipients of the Order of the Red Star